Dogbe is a surname. Notable people with the surname include:

David Oscar Dogbe (born 1984), Ghanaian musician, actor, and comedian
Emmanuel Dogbe (born 1992), Ghanaian footballer
Michael Dogbe (born 1996), American football player
Mickaël Dogbé (born 1976), French-born Togolese footballer